Events from the year 1581 in Sweden

Incumbents
 Monarch – John III

Events

 - Swedish conquest of Narva under Pontus De la Gardie.
 7 May - Wedding of Princess Elizabeth of Sweden and Christopher, Duke of Mecklenburg.
 -  by Per Brahe.

Births

 Johannes Rudbeckius, bishop of Västerås, chaplain of the king (died 1646)
 Elisabeth Gyllenstierna, Swedish court official (died 1646)

Deaths

References

 
Years of the 16th century in Sweden
Sweden